The Central Statistics Office (CSO) is the statistical agency responsible for the gathering of "information relating to economic, social and general activities and conditions" in Ireland, in particular the National Census which is held every five years. The office is answerable to the Taoiseach and has its main offices in Cork.The Director General of the CSO is Pádraig Dalton.

History 

The CSO was established on a statutory basis in 1994 to reduce the number of separate offices responsible for collecting statistics for the state.

The CSO had existed, as an independent ad hoc office within the Department of the Taoiseach since June 1949, and its work greatly increased in the following decades particularly from 1973 with Ireland joining the European Community. Previous to the 1949 reforms, statistics were collected by the Statistics Branch of Department of Industry and Commerce on the creation of the Irish Free State in 1922. The Statistics Branch amalgamated a number of statistics gathering organisations that had existed in Ireland since 1841 when the first comprehensive census was undertaken by the Royal Irish Constabulary.

On 15 September 2020, on the advice of the Central Statistics Office, the Government postponed the quinquennial population census, originally scheduled for 18 April 2021, until 3 April 2022 because of health and logistical obstacles caused by the COVID-19 pandemic.

Head of the Office 

The current Director-General of the Central Statistics Office is Pádraig Dalton.

Household Finance and Consumption Survey 

In 2013 the first ever Household Finance and Consumption Survey (HFCS) was conducted in Ireland by the Central Statistics Office on behalf of the Central Bank of Ireland as part of the European Central Bank (ECB) HFCS scheme/network.

See also

 NUTS statistical regions of Ireland
 Leprechaun economics
 Irish modified GNI (or GNI star)
 Northern Ireland Statistics and Research Agency

References

External links
 Official site - Central Statistics Office
 Population of each Province, County and City, 2002
 Census of Population 2006, Preliminary Report
 National Statistics Board, Ireland

Government agencies of the Republic of Ireland
Ireland
Department of the Taoiseach